Alsinidendron lychnoides is a species of plant in the family Caryophyllaceae. It is endemic to dry forests and low shrublands in Hawaii. It is threatened by habitat loss.

References

Endemic flora of Hawaii
Caryophyllaceae
Critically endangered plants
Taxonomy articles created by Polbot